is a former Japanese football player. He played for the Japan national team He is the current manager J2 League club of Renofa Yamaguchi.

Club career
Natsuka was born in Funabashi on October 7, 1969. After graduating from high school, he joined Fujita Industries (later Bellmare Hiratsuka) in 1988. In 1994, the club won 1994 Emperor's Cup and he was selected Best Eleven. In Asia, the club also won 1995 Asian Cup Winners' Cup. However, he left the club end of 1998 season due to financial strain. In 1999, he moved to J2 League club Consadole Sapporo. The club won the champions in 2000 and was promoted to J1 League. He retired in 2001.

National team career
On May 22, 1994, Natsuka debuted for Japan national team against Australia. In 1994, he played full time in all matches included 1994 Asian Games. In 1995, he also played at 1995 King Fahd Cup. He played 11 games and scored 1 goal for Japan until 1995.

Club statistics

National team statistics

International goals

Awards
J.League Best XI - 1994

References

External links
 
 
 Japan National Football Team Database
 
 

1969 births
Living people
Association football people from Chiba Prefecture
Japanese footballers
Japan international footballers
Japan Soccer League players
J1 League players
J2 League players
Japan Football League (1992–1998) players
Shonan Bellmare players
Hokkaido Consadole Sapporo players
1995 King Fahd Cup players
Association football defenders
Footballers at the 1994 Asian Games
Asian Games competitors for Japan
Japanese football managers
J2 League managers
Renofa Yamaguchi FC managers
People from Funabashi